Liostomia afzelii is a species of sea snail, a marine gastropod mollusk in the family Pyramidellidae, the pyrams and their allies.

Distribution
This species occurs in the following locations:
 European waters (ERMS scope)
 United Kingdom Exclusive Economic Zone

References

 Warén, A. (1991). New and little known Mollusca from Iceland and Scandinavia. Sarsia. 76: 53-124

External links
 To CLEMAM
 To Encyclopedia of Life
 To USNM Invertebrate Zoology Mollusca Collection
 To World Register of Marine Species
 Dyntaxa. (2013). Swedish Taxonomic Database

Pyramidellidae
Gastropods described in 1991